Shanu is a Bangladeshi film actress. She won Bangladesh National Film Award for Best Performance in a Negative Role for the 2003 film Bou Shashurir Juddho.

Selected films
 Shikari - 2001
 Juari - 2002
 Bou Shashurir Juddho - 2003
 Vondo Neta - 2004

Awards and nominations
National Film Awards

References

External links

Bangladeshi film actresses
Living people
Best Performance in a Negative Role National Film Award (Bangladesh) winners
Year of birth missing (living people)